Split Rock is a distinctive oval-shaped rock, cleanly split in a north–south direction to the water line, lying 0.1 nautical miles (0.2 km) northwest of Janus Island, off the southwest coast of Anvers Island. The descriptive name was given by Palmer Station personnel in 1972.

See also
 List of Antarctic and sub-Antarctic islands

References 

Islands of the Palmer Archipelago